IISD is an acronym that may refer to:

International Institute for Sustainable Development
International Indian School Dammam